Leonid Borisovich Bobylev, also Bobylyov (Леони́д Бори́сович Бобылё́в, born October 15, 1949 in Tula) is a Russian composer.

Bobylev graduated from the Moscow Conservatory, where he studied composition with Mikhail Chulaki, a professor at the Moscow Conservatory.

Works
Bobylev has composed 7 operas, 1 ballet, 10 concertos, a symphony, a symphonic poems "De profundis" and "…e poi…", 4 concerti grossi, 9 oratorios and cantatas, chamber music for solo instruments and ensembles, and some music for theatre and motion pictures.

Opera
Gregory Melehov (1980, libretto by A.Medvedev after Mikhail Sholokhov's novel "And Quiet Flows the Don", the concert audition of the fragments Moscow, 1988)
The Lost Hunt (1981, libretto by Tatiana Vershinina and Leonid Bobylev after prose by V. Astafiev, the concert audition Moscow, 1983)
Who Invented the Soap Balloons? (1989, for children, libretto by O. Volozova);
Hi, Alice! (1993, for the juniors, premiere Moscow; 1993)
…With the Last Kissing… (1994, mono-opera, libretto by Leonid Bobylev after the novel Doctor Zhivago by Boris Pasternak premiere Moscow, 2001)
Playing Chehov (2000, libretto by Leonid Bobylev after Anton Chekhov's stories)

Orchestra
Miracles of the Forest, suite (1979)
Symphony (1985)
De Profundis, symphonic poem (premiere Moscow, 1992, recording on Broadcast Nord France 1993)

Concertante
 Concerto for viola and string orchestra (1970)
 Viennese Musical Box (Венская шкатулка), Concerto Grosso No.3 for violin, viola, piano and string orchestra (2007)

External links
 Official site

1949 births
Living people
People from Tula, Russia
Russian male classical composers
Russian opera composers
Male opera composers
Soviet male composers
20th-century Russian male musicians